Zulia Canton was a canton in Maracaibo Province, Zulia Department, Gran Colombia, now in Venezuela.

References

Further reading
 Humberto Ochoa Urdaneta: Memoria Geográfica de la Costa Oriental del Lago de Maracaibo
 Ramón José Velásquez (director), 1998: Gran Enciclopedia de Venezuela. Editorial Globe

Subdivisions of Gran Colombia